Mount Carmel Municipal Airport is a civil, public use airport located 12 miles north of Mount Carmel, Illinois, United States. The airport is publicly owned by the City of Mt Carmel.

History
Land for Mt Carmel Airport was deeded to the City from the U.S. government in 1948. It was one of four airports to support George Field, which served as a pilot training base during World War II. The airport has a dedicated historical and development foundation to continue upkeep and preservation at the airport.

Facilities
The airport has two asphalt runways. Runway 13/31 is 4500 x 75 ft (1372 x 23 m), and runway 4/22 is 4000 x 100 ft (1219 x 30 m).

Services available at the airport include fueling, hangars, courtesy cars, and a pilot's lounge. An A&P mechanic as well as flight instruction are available at the airport.

Aircraft
For the 12-month period ending August 31, 2019, the airport had 30 aircraft operations per day, or roughly 11,000 per year. This is 91% general aviation, 7% air taxi, and 2% military. For the same time period, there were 14 aircraft based on the field: 12 single-engine, 1 multi-engine, and 1 helicopter.

References 

Airports in Illinois